Kjell Hansson (16 July 1931 – 22 June 2019) was a Swedish rower who won a bronze medal in the coxed fours at the 1959 European Championships. He competed in the eights at the 1956 and 1960 Olympics and finished in fourth place in 1956.

References

1931 births
2019 deaths
Swedish male rowers
Olympic rowers of Sweden
Rowers at the 1956 Summer Olympics
Rowers at the 1960 Summer Olympics
European Rowing Championships medalists